Amygdalea is a village in the Elimeia municipal unit, Kozani regional unit, Greece. It is situated at an altitude of 365 meters. The postal code is 50100, and the telephone code is +30 24610. 
The population was 66 at the 2011 census.

References

Populated places in Kozani (regional unit)